The Men's singles competition at the 2021 FIL World Luge Championships was held on 30 January 2021.

Results
The first run was started at 12:50 and the final run at 15:00.

References

Men's singles